Rakan Ben Williams is a name used by various Islamist propaganda outlets to identify a supposed Westerner who converted to Islam and became an al-Qaeda linked terrorist. For example, on March 10, 2006 a warning was issued through the Global Islamic Media Front stating that Rakan Ben Williams was about to commit an act of terrorism in the US.

Despite attention in the right-wing blogosphere, "Williams's" fancied exploits, such as a pre-announced assassination of Silvio Berlusconi, received little attention in the traditional Western news media. 
Rachel Maddow later linked the "Williams" character to "Rakan the Lone Warrior," a popular Middle Eastern comic book hero: "So to recap, today's al-Qaeda news, a probably fake American al-Qaeda convert named after a comic book character raised by a saber-toothed tiger wants President Obama to not be like LeVar Burton, ..."

See also
List of notable converts to Islam
Islamist terrorism

References

Converts to Islam
Islamic terrorism in the United States